Tronadora is a district of the Tilarán canton, in the Guanacaste province of Costa Rica. It is located on the west shore of Lake Arenal. It is connected by road to Tejona and Tilarán along Route 142. The weather is changeable due to the proximity of the confluence of the Pacific coast weather pattern and the inland lake  weather pattern. It is drier and cooler than the Pacific coast due to the elevation of 614 meters (2014 feet).

Geography 
Tronadora has an area of  km² and an elevation of  metres.

Locations 
Poblados: Arenal Viejo, Colonia Menonita, Río Chiquito Abajo, Silencio

Demographics 

For the 2011 census, Tronadora had a population of  inhabitants.

Transportation

Road transportation 
The district is covered by the following road routes:
 National Route 926
 National Route 936

References 

Districts of Guanacaste Province
Lake Arenal
Populated places in Guanacaste Province